Ezhumattoor is a village in Pathanamthitta district in the state of Kerala, [[India].It Is Part Of Thiruvalla Constituency.It  has 27.89 km2 area,it is divided into 14 wards for administrative purpose,it was formed by a government Order on 16 January 1952.

Demographics
 India census, Ezhumattoor had a population of 11,423 with 5,540 males and 5,883 females, with 2774 Number of Households.

Panchayat.Ezhumattoor-
Taluk. Mallappally-
District.Pathanamthitta-
Assembly Constituency.Ranny-
Loksabha Constituency.Pathanamthitta-

Religion
Ezhumattoor's major religions are Hinduism, Christianity, and Islam. Hindus (Brahmins, Nairs, Ezhavas, Viswakarma, & other SC-ST), Muslims and Christians (Roman Catholics, Knanaya, Malankara Catholic, St. Thomas Evangelical Church of India, Malankara Orthodox, Jacobite, Marthoma, Pentecostals such as The Pentecostal Mission known as CPM, India Pentecostal Church of God, etc., live in peace here.

Ezhumattoor Devi Temple

Climate 

Like the rest of the state, Ezhumattoor has a wet and maritime tropical climate. The region receives most of the rain from the South-West monsoon from June to August and the North-East monsoon during October and November. Although the summer is from March to May, it receives locally developed thundershowers in May. Due to the higher elevation, the climate is cooler towards the eastern area.

Economy 

The economy of Ezhumattoor is primarily from agriculture.  Ezhumattoor is one of the rubber producing villages in Kerala. The hilly terrain, high humidity and good rain make it suitable for rubber cultivation. Other major crops are coconut, tapioca and pepper. NRIs are also another major source of income.

Facilities 
Ezhumattoor has the following facilities:

1. Primary Health Centre, Ezhumattoor
2. Post Office
3. Govt Higher Secondary School
4. Library
5. Dental Clinic
6. Telephone Exchange
7. Village Office
8. PSU Bank (Central Bank of India)
9. Co-operative Banks.
10.Federal Bank

Transport 

Ezhumattoor is largely dependent on private buses.  There are few KSRTC buses passing via Ezhumattoor. The nearest KSRTC bus terminus is in Mallappally. Auto rickshaws are available and generally hired for short distances (1–3 km) where bus service is non-existent or rare. Taxis and jeeps are other preferred modes of transport where the terrain is hilly or rugged.

The nearest railway stations are at Thiruvalla and Changanacherry and Chengannur.

Trivandrum International Airport and Cochin International Airport, at Nedumbassery, Kochi are the airports most conveniently used to fly there.

Civic administration 

Ezhumattoor Village is a part of Pathanamthitta district administration. The Ezhumattoor village office is in Hospital Junction and Panchayath office is in Tellioor.
Ezhumattoor is famous for stone quarries, The blue stone from Ezhumattoor is mostly used for Construction of Temples, Homes etc. This place is also well known for the Traditional Ritual art Padayani, Which is performing here yearly during Vishu season at the famous Devi Temple at Panamattathukavu.

State code 32 District code 599 Sub District Code 05680 Village Code (2011) 628308

References

Villages in Pathanamthitta district